IV is the fourth full-length studio album by alternative rock band Veruca Salt. It was released on September 12, 2006 in the United States and on September 25, 2006 in Australia. This is the last album to feature Stephen Fitzpatrick on guitars and the only album to feature Kellii Scott on drums and Nicole Fiorentino on bass.

Track listing

 "Blood on My Hands" and "For Days", as well as alternate recordings of "The Sun" and "Save You", were originally released on the 2005 EP, Lords of Sounds and Lesser Things.

Personnel
Veruca Salt
Louise Post – vocals, guitars, percussion, production
Stephen Fitzpatrick – guitars, mellotron
Kellii Scott – drums, percussion
Nicole Fiorentino – bass guitar

Additional musicians
Matt Walker – percussion, drums
Solomon Snyder – bass guitar
Paul Wiancko – cello
Jonny Polonsky – piano
Rae DeLio – production, engineering, mixing
David Cheppa – mastering
Tony Shanks – design and art direction
Tate Wittenberg – photography
Claire Coleman – make-up

References

External links
 Veruca Salt Official Site 

Veruca Salt albums
2006 albums
Sympathy for the Record Industry albums